This page shows the progress of Morecambe F.C. in the 2009–10 football season. During the season, Morecambe competed in League Two in the English league system. This would be Morecambe's third season in the Football League and their last playing at home at Christie Park

League table

Results

Football League Two

Football League Two play-offs

FA Cup

League Cup

Football League Trophy

References

Morecambe F.C. seasons
Morecambe